Marthe Solange Achy Brou is an Ivorian politician.

Marthe Solange Achy Brou was Minister of Solidarity and Social Affairs in 2000 in the Seydou Diarra government, vice-president of the National Assembly. She was a member of the National Assembly from 1976 to 1980 and from 1986 to 1990, and also mayor of Grand-Bassam from 1985 to 1990.

References

Living people
Members of the National Assembly (Ivory Coast)
20th-century Ivorian women politicians
20th-century Ivorian politicians
21st-century Ivorian women politicians
21st-century Ivorian politicians
Government ministers of Ivory Coast
Women government ministers of Ivory Coast
Mayors of places in Ivory Coast
Women mayors of places in Ivory Coast
Year of birth missing (living people)